"Everything is Vapour/Money and Blood" was the only single from Rational Youth's 1999 album To The Goddess Electricity, and the first entirely new material from the band since 1986.

Track listing
"Everything Is Vapour" – 4:17
"Money And Blood part 2" – 3:52
"Everything Is Vapour (Money And Blood Mix)" [remixed by DIN] – 6:03
"Everything Is Vapour (In The Moment Mix)" [remixed by Will Skol of Transformantra] – 6:16

Personnel
 Tracy Howe - vocals, synthesizers
 Jean-Claude Cutz - synthesizers
 Dave Rout - synthesizers

References

1999 EPs
Rational Youth albums